Pearl Shoal Waterfall is a waterfall located in Jiuzhaigou, Aba-Ngawa Tibetan and Qiang Autonomous Prefecture in northern Sichuan Province, China. The waterfall exists on one of the tributaries of the Bailong River.

Gallery

See also

 Aba, Sichuan

References

World Heritage Sites in China
Waterfalls of China
National parks of China
Landforms of Sichuan
Tourist attractions in Sichuan
Block waterfalls